Sherwood Shores is an unincorporated community and census-designated place in Grayson County, Texas, United States. Its population was 1,190 as of the 2010 census. The community is located on the Red River, which forms the state line with Oklahoma.

Tornadoes
Sherwood Shores was mostly destroyed by an F4 tornado on April 18, 1970, which resulted in 13 deaths in the community and at least 3 others elsewhere along the path. On March 21, 2022 an EF2 tornado struck the town, causing heavy damage, killing one person and injuring 11.

Geography

Demographics

2020 census

As of the 2020 United States census, there were 1,165 people, 400 households, and 184 families residing in the CDP.

References

Unincorporated communities in Grayson County, Texas
Unincorporated communities in Texas
Census-designated places in Grayson County, Texas
Census-designated places in Texas